Pichit Jaibun (born November 7, 1986) simply known as Golf, is a Thai professional footballer who plays as a defensive midfielder for Thai League 3 club Saimit Kabin Unitedt.

International career

In 2013, he was called up to the national team by Surachai Jaturapattarapong to the 2015 AFC Asian Cup qualification.
In October, 2013 he debut for Thailand in a friendly match against Bahrain.
In October 15, 2013 he played against Iran in the 2015 AFC Asian Cup qualification.

International

References

External links
 Profile at Goal

1986 births
Living people
Pichit Jaibun
Pichit Jaibun
Association football midfielders
Pichit Jaibun
Pichit Jaibun
Pichit Jaibun
Pichit Jaibun
Pichit Jaibun
Pichit Jaibun